Tomasz Jan Dąbal (29 December 1890 – 21 August 1937) was a Polish lawyer, activist of the interwar period and politician. He was the co-founder and the head of state of the Republic of Tarnobrzeg, succeeded by the Second Polish Republic.

Life

In 1909–1914, he studied law in Vienna and medicine in Kraków, and he joined the Polish People's Party (1911).

In 1917, he was a member of the Polish Legions in World War I. With Eugeniusz Okoń, he was a founder of the Republic of Tarnobrzeg.
He was a member of the Polish People's Party "Left" and later the Radical Peasant Party, which he co-founded with Okoń. Deputy to Polish Sejm (1918-1921).

He joined the Communist Party of Poland in 1920. In November 1921 he was stripped of his immunity as a member of the parliament and arrested for anti-state agitation. Sentenced to six years in prison in July 1922, he was exchanged for Polish prisoners in the Soviet Union in 1923. In October 1923 he became vice-president of the Peasant International. After Stalin's rise to power, he moved to Minsk where he became vice-president of the Belarusian Academy of Sciences. From 1932 to 1937 he also was a member of the Central Committee of the Communist Party of Byelorussia. Like most of the Polish communist activists in the Soviet Union he was arrested and executed during the Great Purge - after a confession was extracted from him in which he claimed to have directed the Polish Military Organization in the entire Soviet Union. He was exonerated in 1956.

References

Sources
Henryk Cimek, Tomasz Dąbal: 1890-1937, Wyższa Szkoła Pedagogiczna, 1993.
Томаш Францевич Домбаль родился

See also
 Bruno Jasieński

1890 births
1937 deaths
People from Tarnobrzeg
People from the Kingdom of Galicia and Lodomeria
Polish Austro-Hungarians
Radical Peasant Party politicians
Communist Party of Poland politicians
Members of the Legislative Sejm of the Second Polish Republic
Jagiellonian University alumni
Polish legionnaires (World War I)
Academicians of the Byelorussian SSR Academy of Sciences
Members of the Central Committee of the Communist Party of Byelorussia
Soviet politicians
Polish expatriates in the Soviet Union
Polish people executed by the Soviet Union
Great Purge victims from Poland
Soviet rehabilitations